Bernard Mwalala (born 10 October 1984) is a former Kenyan footballer striker and immediate former head coach of Kenyan Premier League side Kakamega Homeboyz F.C.

Career
He played his club football in Kenya, Tanzania, Rwanda, Uganda, Malaysia, and Oman.

He formerly coached Tanzanian lower-tier sides Muweza FC and Magomeni, Coastal Union F.C. as an assistant, and Kenyan sides Nzoia Sugar F.C., Bandari F.C. and Kakamega Homeboyz F.C. as head coach.

References

External links
 

Living people
1984 births
Kenyan footballers
Association football forwards
SC Villa players
Young Africans S.C. players
Rayon Sports F.C. players
Coastal Union F.C. players
Kenyan Premier League players
Kenyan football managers